Craniolaria is a genus of flowering plants in the family Martyniaceae.

There are 3 species:

Craniolaria annua
Craniolaria argentina 
Craniolaria integrifolia

References

Martyniaceae
Lamiales genera